Recep Topal (born 29 january 1992) is a Turkish freestyle wrestler. He won one of the bronze medals in the 61 kg event at the 2019 European Wrestling Championships held in Bucharest, Romania. In 2018, he also won one of the bronze medals in this event.

Career 

In 2020, he competed in the men's 62 kg event at the Individual Wrestling World Cup held in Belgrade, Serbia.

In 2022, he lost his bronze medal match in his event at the Yasar Dogu Tournament held in Istanbul, Turkey. A few months later, he won the gold medal in his event at the Matteo Pellicone Ranking Series 2022 held in Rome, Italy. He won one of the bronze medals in the men's 61 kg event at the 2021 Islamic Solidarity Games held in Konya, Turkey.

Major results

References

External links 
 

Living people
1992 births
Place of birth missing (living people)
Turkish male sport wrestlers
European Wrestling Championships medalists
Islamic Solidarity Games competitors for Turkey
Islamic Solidarity Games medalists in wrestling
21st-century Turkish people